Saint-Père-en-Retz (literally Saint-Père in Retz) is a commune in the Loire-Atlantique department in western France. As of 2019 it has a population of 4,576.

Notable people
Francis Aupiais(1877-1945), missionary and ethnographer in Africa

See also
Communes of the Loire-Atlantique department

References

Saintpereenretz